The 153rd Massachusetts General Court, consisting of the Massachusetts Senate and the Massachusetts House of Representatives, met in 1943 and 1944.

Senators

Representatives

See also
 1944 Massachusetts gubernatorial election
 78th United States Congress
 List of Massachusetts General Courts

References

Further reading

External links
 
 
 

Political history of Massachusetts
Massachusetts legislative sessions
massachusetts
1943 in Massachusetts
massachusetts
1944 in Massachusetts